LaBahn Arena is the home ice of the Wisconsin Badgers women's ice hockey team.  It was the second arena to be purpose-built for a women's collegiate hockey team; the first was Minnesota's Ridder Arena. The arena is connected via a tunnel to the Kohl Center, which the women's team shared with the men's team from its inception in 1999 until 2012. The men's team also practices there. The facility also houses locker rooms for the swimming and diving teams.

Naming
The arena is named for longtime Badger boosters Chuck and Mary Ann LaBahn, its main fundraisers.

Background
Before 2012, the women's ice hockey team drove from its headquarters at the Camp Randall Memorial Sports Center to the Kohl Center. Whenever the Kohl Center was being readied for a basketball game, the women drove to a rink in nearby Verona for practice. The men often practiced at the Bob Johnson Hockey Facility three miles from campus or the Memorial Sports Center when the Kohl Center was being readied for basketball. Some questioned the safety of the players during these drives, especially during Madison's often snowy and icy winters.

In the 2020-21 season, the men's ice hockey team also played at LaBahn Arena for cost and league reasons.  As the Big Ten Conference mandated all conference games be played behind closed doors, and the cost of converting Kohl Center between basketball and hockey during the pandemic without attendance, the team played games at LaBahn, which also serves as the backup venue for men.

References

External links
Info page at UWBadgers.com

Indoor arenas in Wisconsin
College ice hockey venues in the United States
University of Wisconsin–Madison
Sports venues in Madison, Wisconsin
Indoor ice hockey venues in Wisconsin